The Robert and Lillie May Stone House is a historic Victorian home, located at 4901 47th Street, Northwest, Washington, D.C., in the American University Park neighborhood.

It was added to the National Register of Historic Places in 2011.

References

Houses on the National Register of Historic Places in Washington, D.C.